Zdzisław Mordarski (16 June 1922 – 18 February 1991) was a Polish footballer. He played in twelve matches for the Poland national football team from 1948 to 1954.

References

External links
 

1922 births
1991 deaths
Polish footballers
Poland international footballers
Place of birth missing
Association footballers not categorized by position